Primelin is a commune in the Finistère department of Brittany in north-western France. Inhabitants of Primelin are called in French Primelinois.

International relations
It is twinned with the Cornish village of Mabe.

See also
Communes of the Finistère department
List of the works of the Maître de Plougastel

References

External links

Mayors of Finistère Association 

Communes of Finistère
Populated coastal places in France